From 1887 onwards Tipperary has been a stalwart in all aspects of the GAA. Winning many accolades over the years, they have won many first titles and along with Cork and Galway, is the only county to have won Senior All-Irelands in Hurling, Men's football, Camogie and Ladies' Football. Tipperary is the only county to win Senior Inter-county titles in Hurling, Football, Ladies' Football, Camogie, Hardball singles and doubles, Softball singles and doubles, 40x20 Senior singles and 40x20 Senior doubles. Tipperary is also the only county to win the Hurling Senior All-Ireland in every decade since the inception of the competition in 1887.

Hurling

All-Ireland Senior Hurling Championships: 28
1887, 1895, 1896, 1898, 1899, 1900, 1906, 1908, 1916, 1925, 1930, 1937, 1945, 1949, 1950, 1951, 1958, 1961, 1962, 1964, 1965, 1971, 1989, 1991, 2001, 2010, 2016, 2019

All-Ireland Under-21 Hurling Championships: 11
1964, 1967, 1979, 1980, 1981, 1985, 1989, 1995, 2010, 2018, 2019

All-Ireland Minor Hurling Championships: 21
1930, 1932, 1933, 1934, 1947, 1949, 1952, 1953, 1955, 1956, 1957, 1959, 1976, 1980, 1982, 1996, 2006, 2007, 2012, 2016, 2022

All-Ireland Junior Hurling Championships: 9
1913, 1915, 1924, 1926, 1930, 1933, 1953, 1989, 1991

All-Ireland Intermediate Hurling Championships: 7
1963, 1966, 1971, 1972, 2000, 2012, 2013

All-Ireland Vocational Schools Championships:14
1962, 1964, 1965, 1966, 1967, 1968, 1969, 1974, 1978, 1988, 1990, 2004, 2010, 2011 (1962-1978 winners were North Tipperary)

National Hurling Leagues: 19
1928, 1949, 1950, 1952, 1954, 1955, 1957, 1959, 1960, 1961, 1964, 1965, 1968, 1979, 1988, 1994, 1999, 2001, 2008

Munster Senior Hurling Championships: 42
1895, 1896, 1898, 1899, 1900, 1906, 1908, 1909, 1913, 1916, 1917, 1922, 1924, 1925, 1930, 1937, 1941, 1945, 1949, 1950, 1951, 1958, 1960, 1961, 1962, 1964, 1965, 1967, 1968, 1971, 1987, 1988, 1989, 1991, 1993, 2001, 2008, 2009, 2011, 2012, 2015,2016

Munster Under-21 Hurling Championships: 21
1964, 1965, 1967, 1972, 1978, 1979, 1980, 1981, 1983, 1984, 1985, 1989, 1990, 1995, 1999, 2003, 2004, 2006, 2008, 2010, 2019

Munster Minor Hurling Championships: 41
1930, 1931, 1932, 1933, 1934, 1935, 1945, 1946, 1947, 1949, 1950, 1952, 1953, 1954, 1955, 1956, 1957, 1959, 1960, 1961, 1962, 1973, 1976, 1980, 1982, 1983, 1987, 1991, 1993, 1996, 1997, 1999, 2001, 2002, 2003, 2007, 2012, 2015, 2016, 2018, 2022

Munster Junior Hurling Championships: 16
1910, 1911, 1913, 1915, 1924, 1926, 1928, 1930, 1933, 1951, 1953, 1985, 1988, 1989, 1990, 1991

Munster Intermediate Hurling Championships: 9
1961, 1963, 1966, 1971, 1972, 2000, 2002, 2012, 2013

Waterford Crystal Cup: 4
2007, 2008, 2012, 2014

Wembley Tournament (Monaghan Cup): 20
1931, 1938, 1939, 1940, 1946, 1947, 1949, 1950, 1951, 1952, 1953, 1954, 1955, 1956, 1961, 1962, 1963, 1964, 1965, 1969, 1972

Thomond Tournament: 8
1915, 1916, 1924, 1927, 1930, 1931, 1949, 1951

Oireachtas Tournament: 11
1945, 1949, 1960, 1961, 1963, 1964, 1965, 1968, 1970, 1972, 1990

All-Star Awards: 104

Camogie

All-Ireland Senior Camogie Championships: 5
 1999, 2000, 2001, 2003, 2004
All-Ireland Minor Camogie Championships: 1
 2011
All Ireland Under-16 camogie championships: 4
 1990, 1992, 1993, 2011
All-Ireland Junior Camogie Championships: 2
1992, 2001
National Camogie League: 2
 1976, 2004

All-Star Awards: 17
2004: S. Kelly, U. O'Dwyer, C. Gaynor, T. Brophy, C. Grogan, D. Hughes
2005: J. Delaney, J. Kirwan, C. Grogan, E. McDonnell
2006: J. Delaney, S. Kelly, P. Fogarty, J. Ryan
2007: P. Fogarty, C. Grogan
2008: T. O'Halloran,

Football

All-Ireland Senior Football Championships: 4
1889, 1895, 1900, 1920

All-Ireland Senior B Football Championships: 1
1995

All-Ireland Under-21 Football Championships: None
The furthest Tipp have gotten is an All-Ireland final in 2015 against Tyrone.

All-Ireland Minor Football Championships: 2
1934, 2011

All-Ireland Junior Football Championships: 3
1912, 1923, 1998

National Football Leagues: 3

Munster Senior Football Championships: 10
1888, 1889, 1895, 1900, 1902, 1918, 1920, 1922, 1935, 2020

Munster Under-21 Football Championships: 2

Munster Minor Football Championships: 7
1934, 1935, 1955, 1984, 1995, 2011, 2012

Munster Junior Football Championships: 7
1910, 1912, 1923, 1935, 1937, 1952, 1998

Tommy Murphy Cup: 1

McGrath Cups:3
1989, 1993, 2003

Munster Football League 2
1929-30, 1934-35

All-Star Awards: 3
1998: Declan Browne
2003: Declan Browne
2016: Michael Quinlivan

Ladies' Football
All-Ireland Senior Ladies' Football Championships: 3
1974, 1975, 1980
All-Ireland Under-18 Ladies' Football Championships: None
All-Ireland Intermediate Ladies' Football Championships: 3
2008, 2017, 2019
All-Ireland Under-16 Ladies' Football Championships: 3
1978, 1979, 1980
National Senior Ladies' Football League Division 1: 1
1979
National Ladies' Football League Division 2: 1
2018
National Ladies' Football League Division 3: 1
2005

All-Star Awards: 7
1980: A. Maher, J. Stapleton, L. Gory
1981: A. Maher, L. Gory
1982: M. O'Shea
2008: E. Hanly

Handball

Senior Hardball Singles: 2
1966 (P. Hickey)
1971 (P. Hickey)
Senior Hardball Doubles: 8
1929 (P. Ormonde & C. Moloney)
1931 (P. Ormonde & C. Moloney)
1962 (J. Ryan & M. Shanahan)
1968 (P. Hickey & C. Cleere)
1972 (P. Hickey & C. Cleere)
1975 (P. Hickey & J. Cleere)
1989 (W. McCarthy & N. Ryan)
1995 (E. Corbett & N. Ryan)
Senior Softball Singles: 3
1948 (J. Bergin)
1950 (J. Bergin)
1983 (A. Ryan)
Senior Softball Doubles: 8
1934 (J. Hassett & E. Hassett)
1935 (J. Hassett & E. Hassett)
1936 (J. Hassett & E. Hassett)
1937 (J. Hassett & E. Hassett)
1938 (J. Hassett & E. Hassett)
1942 (J. Collins & C. Collins)
1949 (J. Bergin & J. Sweeney)
1950 (J. Bergin & J. Sweeney)
Senior 40x20 Singles: 5
1981 (A. Ryan)
1982 (A. Ryan)
1983 (A. Ryan)
1993 (E. Corbett)
1994 (E. Corbett)
Senior 40x20 Doubles: 1
1991 (E. Corbett & J. O'Donoghue)

References

Honours